Fadi Abouabsi (born December 16, 1986) professionally known by his stage name FDAMusic, is a Saudi-born American rapper. At the age of 18, he started his first musical venture, Overgrind Records, with business partner B-Luce in 2004. He released his second solo album, Fame, in 2015, which received critical acclaim from underground hip-hop magazines Streetkode, 24hour Hip Hop, and Coast 2 Coast Mixtapes. FDAMusic has worked with other notable underground rappers such as Kirko Bangz and Kevin Gates. He has also worked on projects with producers Savages, Kalani on Da Beat, and The Mechanics.

Life and career

Scarface Icon Music Tours
In 2016 FDAmusic participated in opening for Houston rapper scarface on the Icon tour.

American Lebanese Culture Center
FDAMusic is active in the Arab and Lebanese communities in Houston, Texas. In 2015 he helped sponsor the American Lebanese Culture Center’s Lebanese Festival, held April 18–19, 2015. The event helped promote Lebanese culture while celebrating the local community’s contributions to Houston, Texas.

Racial profiling and policing
In December 2014, FDAMusic was featured on Lisa Evers’ HOT97 podcast, Street Soldiers. FDAMusic discussed his experiences with racial profiling and issues of racism in American policing strategies.

Discography

Studio albums
 Fame (2015)
 Made It (2014)

Mixtapes/compilations
 Overgrind Empire (2015)
 Fame – Mixtapes (2015)
 FDAMusic V.I.P. with DJ Khasper Bhinks and Coast 2 Coast DJs Singles (2014)

Singles
 "Trap House” – Made It (2014)
 ""I Know It" ft. Kevin Gates - Fame" (2015)
 ""All into her" ft. Kirko Bangz - Fame" (2015)

Tours

2016 Scarface Iconic Tour

References

External links

Rappers from Houston
1986 births
Living people
21st-century American rappers